John Deasley (1864–1910) was a professional baseball player. In 1884, he saw action in 44 games for the Washington Nationals and Kansas City Cowboys of the Union Association. He hit just .207 that season and never played in a real major league.

Deasley played in various minor leagues until 1890. He died on New Year's Eve, 1910, at the age of 47 and is interred at Mount Moriah Cemetery in Philadelphia, Pennsylvania.

References

External links

1861 births
1910 deaths
Burials at Mount Moriah Cemetery (Philadelphia)
Major League Baseball shortstops
Washington Nationals (UA) players
Kansas City Cowboys (UA) players
Reading Actives players
Harrisburg Ponies players
19th-century baseball players
Baseball players from Philadelphia